Jeremiah Paul "Jerry" Ostriker (born April 13, 1937) is an American astrophysicist and a professor of astronomy at Columbia University and is the Charles A. Young Professor Emeritus at Princeton where he also continues as a senior research scholar. Ostriker has also served as a university administrator as Provost of Princeton University.

Education
He received his B.A. from Harvard, and his Ph.D at the University of Chicago.

Career and research
After earning his Ph.D. at Chicago, he conducted post-doctoral work at the University of Cambridge. From 1971 to 1995, Ostriker was a professor at Princeton, and served as Provost there from 1995 to 2001. From 2001 to 2003, he was appointed as Plumian Professor of Astronomy and Experimental Philosophy at the Institute of Astronomy, Cambridge.  He then returned to Princeton as the Charles Young Professor of Astronomy and is now the Charles A. Young Professor Emeritus.  He continues as a senior research scholar at Princeton and became a professor of astronomy at Columbia in 2012.

Ostriker has been very influential in advancing the theory that most of the mass in the universe is not visible at all, but consists of dark matter. His research has also focused on the interstellar medium, galaxy evolution, cosmology and black holes. On June 20, 2013 Ostriker was given the White House Champions of Change Award for his role in initiating the Sloan Digital Sky Survey project, which makes all of its astronomical data sets available publicly on the Internet 

Ostriker is also known for the Ostriker–Peebles criterion, relating to the stability of galactic formation.

Publications
As of April 2021, Ostriker's articles have been cited over 85,910 times and he has an h-index of 130 (130 papers with at least 130 citations) according to the NASA Astrophysics Data System including: 

 "Precision Cosmology? Not Just Yet"
Heart of Darkness, Unraveling the Mysteries of the Invisible Universe Princeton University Press (2013)
New Light on Dark Matter, Science, 300, pp 1909–1914 (2003) 
The Probability Distribution Function of Light in the Universe: Results from Hydrodynamic Simulations, Astrophysical Journal 597, 1 (2003)
Cosmic Mach Number as a Function of Overdensity and Galaxy Age, Astrophysical Journal, 553, 513 (2001)
Collisional Dark Matter and the Origin of Massive Black Holes, Physical Review Letters, 84, 5258-5260 (2000).
Hydrodynamics of Accretion onto Black Holes, Adv. Space Res., 7, 951-960 (1998).

Awards and honors
Ostriker has won numerous awards and honors including:

Membership of the National Academy of Sciences (1974)
Membership of the American Academy of Arts and Sciences (1975)
Helen B. Warner Prize for Astronomy of the American Astronomical Society (AAS) (1972)
Henry Norris Russell Lectureship of the AAS (1980)
INSA-Vainu Bappu Memorial Award (1993)
Membership of the American Philosophical Society (1994)
Foreign membership of the Royal Netherlands Academy of Arts and Sciences (1999)
 Karl Schwarzschild Medal (1999)
National Medal of Science by U.S. President Bill Clinton (2000)
 Golden Plate Award of the American Academy of Achievement (2001)
Gold Medal of the Royal Astronomical Society (2004)
 Elected a Foreign Member of the Royal Society (ForMemRS) in 2007
Bruce Medal (2011)
James Craig Watson Medal (2012)
White House Champion of Change (2013)
Gruber Prize in Cosmology (2015)
Elected a Legacy Fellow of the American Astronomical Society in 2020.

Personal life
Ostriker married noted poet and essayist Alicia Ostriker (née Suskin) in 1959. Together they have three adult children: Rebecca, Eve, and Gabriel. Like her father, Eve became an astrophysics professor at Princeton University, in 2012, the same year as her father's retirement. Jeremiah and Alicia Ostriker have been residents of Princeton, New Jersey.

References

1937 births
Living people
People from Princeton, New Jersey
Fellows of Clare College, Cambridge
Members of the United States National Academy of Sciences
Harvard University alumni
University of Chicago alumni
Princeton University faculty
Columbia University faculty
American astronomers
National Medal of Science laureates
Recipients of the Gold Medal of the Royal Astronomical Society
Foreign Members of the Royal Society
Members of the Royal Netherlands Academy of Arts and Sciences
Fellows of the American Academy of Arts and Sciences
Fellows of the American Astronomical Society
Members of the American Philosophical Society
Plumian Professors of Astronomy and Experimental Philosophy